The 2011–12 IFA Premiership (known as the Carling Premiership for sponsorship reasons) was the fourth season since its establishment after a major overhaul of the league system in Northern Ireland, and the 111th season of Irish league football overall. The season began on 6 August 2011, and ended on 28 April 2012.

Linfield were the defending champions, after winning their 50th title last season. They successfully defended their title, to win the league for the sixth time in seven seasons after a 2–1 home win over Portadown on 7 April 2012.

Carrick Rangers were relegated to Championship 1 after only one season in the top flight. Dungannon Swifts' 2–1 win over Donegal Celtic on 21 April 2012 left them bottom of the table by four points, with only one game remaining. Lisburn Distillery retained their Premiership status by defeating Newry City 3–2 over two legs in the promotion/relegation play-off.

Teams
2010–11 IFA Championship 1 winners Carrick Rangers were promoted to this season's Premiership, with last season's bottom-placed Premiership club Newry City replacing them in Championship 1.

Championship 1 runners-up Limavady United were not eligible to take part in a promotion/relegation play-off against last season's 11th-placed Premiership club Donegal Celtic, as they did not attain the required domestic licence.

Stadia and locations

1 Carrick Rangers played their home matches at Crusaders' Seaview ground.

League table

Results

Matches 1–22
During matches 1–22 each team played every other team twice (home and away).

Matches 23–33
During matches 23–33 each team played other team for the third time (either at home, or away).

Matches 34–38
During matches 34–38 each team played every other team in their half of the table once. As this was the fourth time that teams had played each other this season, home sides in this round were chosen so that teams played each other twice at home and twice away.

Section A

Section B

Promotion/relegation play-off
Lisburn Distillery, the club that finished in the relegation play-off place, faced Newry City, the runners-up of the 2011–12 IFA Championship in a two-legged tie for a place in next season's IFA Premiership.

Lisburn Distillery won the tie 3–2 on aggregate and retained their Premiership status.

Lisburn Distillery won 3–2 on aggregate and remained in the IFA Premiership

Top goalscorers

IFA Premiership clubs in Europe 2011–12

UEFA coefficient and ranking
For the 2011–12 UEFA competitions, the associations were allocated places according to their 2010 UEFA country coefficients, which took into account their performance in European competitions from 2005–06 to 2009–10. In the 2010 rankings used for this season's European competitions, Northern Ireland's coefficient points total was 1.624. After earning a score of only 0.125 during the 2009–10 European campaign, the league was ranked by UEFA as the 49th best league in Europe out of 53 - falling two places from 47th the previous season. This season Northern Ireland earned 0.500 points, which was added to the points total for the 2012 rankings used in 2013–14 UEFA competitions.

 47  Montenegro 2.125
 48  Faroe Islands 1.832
 49  Northern Ireland 1.624
 50  Luxembourg 1.249
 51  Andorra 1.000
 Full list

UEFA Champions League
After winning the league last season, Linfield were the league's sole representatives in the UEFA Champions League. They entered at the second qualifying round. They were drawn against Belarusian side BATE Borisov, a club that reached the group stage of the 2008–09 competition.

Linfield were massive underdogs for the tie. However they produced a commendable performance in the first leg to earn a 1–1 draw. In the second leg in Belarus, Linfield again put on a brave display but ultimately lost 0–2 to their full-time opponents and exited the competition 1–3 on aggregate.

UEFA Europa League
2010–11's League and Irish Cup runners-up Crusaders, 3rd-placed Glentoran, and 4th-placed Cliftonville all earned a place in the UEFA Europa League. Glentoran and Cliftonville entered the competition at the first qualifying round. Crusaders entered at the second qualifying round.

In the first qualifying round there were mixed results. Glentoran were drawn against Macedonian club FK Renova. They lost the first leg 1–2 away from home, but were 2–1 victors in the return leg at home. With the teams tied 3–3 on aggregate, the tie went to extra time and eventually to a penalty shoot-out. Glentoran won the shoot-out 3–2 to progress to the second qualifying round.

Cliftonville were drawn against Welsh side The New Saints. They earned a creditable 1–1 draw in the first leg away from home. However, they succumbed to a 0–1 defeat in the second leg at home which meant they lost the tie 1–2 on aggregate and exited the competition.

In the second qualifying round Crusaders faced Premier League side Fulham, runners-up of the competition in 2009–10. In the first leg at home, Crusaders produced a battling display, but in the end went down 1–3 to their English opponents. Glentoran were drawn against Vorskla Poltava from Ukraine. They too were defeated in the first leg at home, losing 0–2. In the second legs, both Crusaders and Glentoran crashed out of Europe after being outclassed by their opponents. Crusaders went down 0–4 to Fulham, losing the tie 1–7 on aggregate. Glentoran went down 0–3 to Vorskla Poltava, losing the tie 0–5 on aggregate.

That concluded the IFA Premiership's involvement in Europe this season.

References

2011-12
North
1